Chavak or Chavok or Chawak may refer to:
 Chavak, Bushehr
 Chavak, Kurdistan